Blanche Hoschedé Monet  (10 November 1865 – 8 December 1947) was a French painter who was both the stepdaughter and the daughter-in-law of Claude Monet.

Early life

Ernest and Alice Hoschedé
Blanche Hoschedé was born in Paris, the second daughter of Ernest Hoschedé and Alice Hoschedé. Ernest was a businessman, a department store magnate in Paris. He collected  impressionist paintings and was an important patron to Claude Monet early in his career. In 1876, he commissioned Claude Monet to paint decorative panels in the round drawing room, in his residence, the château de Rottembourg, in Montgeron. In 1877, Ernest Hoschedé went bankrupt and his art collection was auctioned off.

Life with the Monets

Ernest Hoschedé, Alice, and their six children moved into a house in Vétheuil with Monet, his wife Camille, and their two sons, Jean and the infant Michel. Ernest, however, spent most of his time in Paris, and eventually went to Belgium. After the death of Camille in Vétheuil on 5 September 1879, Alice and her children continued living with Monet. In 1881, they moved to Poissy, and finally settled in their home in Giverny in 1883. Although Ernest and Alice Hoschedé never divorced, Claude Monet and Alice went on living together until after the death of Ernest in 1891. Claude Monet and Alice Hoschedé got married on 16 July 1892.

Education

The only child in the Hoschedé-Monet household to become interested in art, Blanche began painting at the age of eleven and developed a fond relationship with Claude Monet. She visited his studio as well as Édouard Manet's. By the time she was 17 years old, she was Monet's assistant and only student, often painting en plein air alongside him, painting the same subject with the same colors.

Blanche also painted alongside American expatriates Theodore Earl Butler and John Leslie Breck.  Monet stopped the romance that had developed between Blanche and Breck, while he allowed Butler to marry Blanche's sister, Suzanne Hoschedé, in 1892.

The art dealer Paul Durand-Ruel purchased a Haystack painting by Blanche, and it currently is displayed in Monet's house in Giverny. In January 1888, while in Antibes, Monet encouraged Blanche to submit a work to the Salon.

Jean and Claude Monet
Blanche married Claude Monet's eldest son, Jean Monet, in 1897. The couple lived in Rouen, where Jean worked as a chemist for his uncle Léon Monet, and until 1913 in Beaumont-le-Roger.

Her mother, Alice, died on 19 May 1911, and Jean on 10 February 1914, after a long illness. Overcome with grief, Claude Monet suffered from depression and, from that point on, Blanche took over her father-in-law's household. She watched over him as his eyesight was failing him to the point he believed he was going blind. Georges Clemenceau, their common friend, called her Monet's "Blue Angel". After Monet's death on 5 December 1926, and for twenty years until her own in 1947, she took on the responsibility of the house and gardens at Giverny. She died in Nice, aged 82.

Career

Most of Blanche's works were done in Giverny from 1883 to 1897, which was similar to that of Monet's work, and around Rouen. She "adopted an almost pure form of impressionism."

She painted landscapes with trees such as pines and poplars, and meadows along the Risle river. In the 1920s, she also painted on several occasions at Georges Clemenceau's property in Saint-Vincent-sur-Jard (Vendée department) in the west of France, where she made paintings of the garden, house and the Atlantic Ocean. After Monet's death, she remained in Giverny and continued painting. Recognizing her body of work, a street bears her name in the village of Giverny.

Dr. Janine Burke believes that Blanche may have assisted Monet in the painting of the Grandes Décorations. Monet had trained and encouraged Blanche as an artist. In a chapter on Blanche and Monet in Source: Nature's Healing Role in Art and Writing (2009), Burke comments, "Given the sheer scale of the surfaces to be covered in the Grandes Décorations, it is logical to consider Monet had an assistant, and who better than Blanche?"

Gallery

Exhibitions

Solo exhibitions
 1927 - Galerie Bernheim-Jeune, Paris: Blanche Hoschedé (November 7–18, 1927)
 1931 - Galerie Bernheim-Jeune, Paris: Blanche Hoschedé Monet (March 9–20, 1931)
 1942 - Galerie Daber, Paris: Blanche Hoschedé ( October 16-  November 7, 1942)
 1947 - Galerie d’art Drouot Provence, Paris: Blanche Hoschedé Monet (March 14- April 14, 1947)

Group exhibitions
 Many times between 1905 and 1954 - Salon des Indépendants
 Many times between 1907 and 1935 - Salon de la Société des Artistes Rouennais
 1954 - Galerie Zak, Paris, November 19-December 3, 1954.
 1928 - Galerie Georges Petit, Catalogue des œuvres importantes Camille Pissarro et de tableaux, pastels, aquarelles, dessins, gouaches par Mary Cassatt, Cézanne, Édouard Dufeu, Delacroix, Guillaumin, Blanche Hoschedé, Jongkind, Le Bail, Luce, Manet, Claude Monet, Piette, Seurat, Signac, Sisley, van Rysselberghe, etc..
 1957 - Vernon, Blanche-Hoschedé-Monet
 1959 - Musée des Beaux-Arts de Rouen: Blanche Hoschedé Monet, Henry Ottman
 1960 - Charles E. Slatkin Galleries, New York: Claude Monet and the Giverny Artists
 1988 - Modern Art Museum Ibaraki, Kyoto, Fukushima: Monet and his Friends
 1991 - AG Poulain, Vernon: Blanche Hoschedé Monet

Collections
Blanche Hoschedé Monet's works are in the following museums:
 Toulouse-Lautrec Museum, Albi: Port de Saint-Jean-Cap-Ferrat
 Musée Clemenceau, Paris: Garden in Giverny
 Maison de Georges Clemenceau, Belebat: The Garden of Clemenceau and The Garden and the House
 Musée Marmottan Monet, Paris: Along the River and House of Sorel-Moussel
 Musée des Beaux-Arts de Rouen: Poplars along the River, Pivoines, and Claude Monet’s Garden
 Musée des Augustins, Toulouse: The Garden and House of Claude Monet in Giverny
 Musée de la Cohue, Vannes: Le bassin, temps gris
 Musée A.G. Poulain, Vernon: House of Claude Monet, L’étang de Giverny, Beach in Normandy, and The Cabbage
 Fondation Monet in Giverny

Works
Partial list of Blanche Hoschedé Monet's works:
 The Banks of the Seine, oil on canvas
 Claude Monet's Garden at Giverny, oil on canvas
 A Corner of the Garden at Giverny in Spring, oil on canvas
 Flowers in a Copper Vase, oil on canvas
 The Garden, oil on cardboard
 The Garden, 1904, oil on canvas
 The Garden at Giverny, 1927, oil on canvas
 Garden Flowers,  1930, oil on canvas
 The Gardens of Claude Monet in Giverny, oil on canvas
 Giverny: Rose Bush and Lilies, oil on canvas
 Haystack, oil on canvas
 The Japanese Bridge in Monet's Garden, oil on canvas
 The Lake, oil on canvas
 The Monet Rose Garden, oil on canvas
 Monet's Rose Garden at Giverny, oil on canvas
 A Road near Giverny, oil on canvas
 Still Life with Asters, Pitcher and Apples, oil on canvas
 Water Lilies, 1946, oil on canvas
 Water Lilies, oil on canvas
 Water Lilies at Giverny, oil on canvas
 Willows by the Pond in Giverny, oil on canvas

Popular culture
A movie entitled Monet, la lumière blanche, directed by Chantal Picault, will be produced including the following actors:
Claude Monet played by Gérard Depardieu
Blanche Hoschedé Monet played by Sandrine Bonnaire
Georges Clemenceau played by Michel Galabru

Notes

References

Further reading

External links

1865 births
1947 deaths
Artists from Paris
People from Eure
French women painters
French Impressionist painters
Blanche Hoschede Monet
19th-century French painters
20th-century French painters
20th-century French women artists
19th-century French women artists